The Monument to Isabella the Catholic (Spanish: Monumento a Isabel la Católica) also known as the Monumento a Isabel la Católica y Colón ("Monument to Isabella the Catholic and Columbus") or monumento del IV Centenario ("Monument of the 400th Anniversary") is an instance of public art in Granada, Spain. Designed by Mariano Benlliure, it consists of a bronze sculptural group depicting a meeting of Isabella I of Castile with Christopher Columbus

History and description 

By 1890, several Spanish cities had already set arrangements in motion in order to erect their own commemorative monument to the 400th anniversary of the first voyage of Christopher Columbus to the Americas.

However, even after asking for funds to the Government of Spain, a largely ruined Ayuntamiento de Granada did not have even a fraction of the budget needed to carry out such impressively large-scale endeavour, so a public contest for a new project was called. After the contest was declared void, Prime Minister Cánovas del Castillo personally took action and awarded the design to Mariano Benlliure.

The bronze sculptural group topping off the monument depicts a meeting of Columbus with Queen Isabella, seated on her throne. The upper part of the pedestal serves as a staircase on which Columbus stops to bow to the queen. The sculptural group was also reportedly set to include a figure of Boabdil, but the idea just fell apart.

The commemoration of the 400th anniversary utterly failed; it did not even take place on 12 October as it was intended in the first place. Queen regent Maria Christina of Habsburg–Lorraine refused to travel to Granada to inaugurate the monument. This caused a revolt in the city that ended with fires, riots and barricades. With the town in arms, after setting fire to the withered ornamental arches that had been prepared time ago to welcome the royal retinue, the scorned people of Granada informally unveiled the monument on 2 November 1892, then placed in its original location at the Paseo del Salón.

References 
Citations

Bibliography
 
 
 
 
 

1892 sculptures
Statues of Isabella I of Castile
Statues of Christopher Columbus
Outdoor sculptures in Andalusia
Bronze sculptures in Spain
Monuments and memorials in Andalusia
Buildings and structures in Granada
Sculptures by Mariano Benlliure
Sculptures of women in Spain
Sculptures of men in Spain